Piassava, also piaçava, piaçaba, piasaba, pissaba, piassaba, and piaçá, is a fibrous product of Brazilian palm species Attalea funifera and Leopoldinia piassaba. It is often used in making brooms and for other purposes.

Piassava was historically exported to Europe before the widespread use of synthetic materials such as plastic. Today, it is mostly used locally in South America.

See also
West African piassava palm

References 

 Exploration of the Valley of the Amazon Vol. I by Lieutenant William Lewis Herndon (1853) chapter 14, p. 285
 Webster's Revised Unabridged Dictionary (1913)

Plant common names
Fiber plants